Andreas Müller (born 25 November 1979) is a German-born Austrian professional racing cyclist. He rode at the 2015 UCI Track Cycling World Championships, and in the 2020 Summer Olympics.

Major results

2000
 1st  Team pursuit, German National Track Championships
 2nd  Team pursuit, UCI Track Cycling World Cup Classics, Moscow
2001
 Team pursuit, UCI Track Cycling World Cup Classics
1st  Szczecin
1st  Ipoh
 1st  Points race, German National Track Championships
2002
 1st  Points race, German National Track Championships
 3rd  Madison, UCI Track Cycling World Cup Classics, Kunming (with Guido Fulst)
2003
 UCI Track Cycling World Cup Classics
1st  Madison, Moscow (with Guido Fulst)
1st  Madison, Sydney (with Guido Fulst)
2nd  Points race, Cape Town
2nd  Team pursuit, Sydney
3rd  Scratch, Sydney
 1st  Madison, German National Track Championships
2005
 1st  Points race, German National Track Championships
 2nd  Scratch, 2005–06 UCI Track Cycling World Cup Classics, Moscow
 3rd  Madison, 2004–05 UCI Track Cycling World Cup Classics, Manchester (with Leif Lampater)
2008
 Austrian National Track Championships
1st  Madison (with Andreas Graf)
1st  Points race
1st  Scratch
 2nd  Scratch, 2007–08 UCI Track Cycling World Cup Classics, Copenhagen
2009
 3rd  Scratch, UCI Track Cycling World Championships
2013
 1st  Scratch, 2013–14 UCI Track Cycling World Cup, Manchester
 1st  Points race, Austrian National Track Championships
 2nd  Scratch, UCI Track Cycling World Championships
 3rd Six Days of Berlin (with Franco Marvulli)
2014
 1st  Madison, UEC European Track Championships (with Andreas Graf)
 Austrian National Track Championships
1st  Kilo
1st  Points race
 1st Six Days of Berlin (with Kenny De Ketele)
 3rd Six Days of Bremen (with Marc Hester)
2015
 1st  Madison, Austrian National Track Championships (with Andreas Graf)
 1st Stage 7 Rás Tailteann
2016
 3rd Six Days of Copenhagen (with Andreas Graf)
2017
 3rd  Madison, 2017–18 UCI Track Cycling World Cup, Santiago (with Andreas Graf)
2019
 2nd Hong Kong, 2018–19 Six Day Series (with Andreas Graf)
 3rd  Madison, European Games (with Andreas Graf)
 3rd Six Days of Berlin (with Andreas Graf)

References

External links

1979 births
Living people
Austrian male cyclists
Cyclists from Berlin
Cyclists at the 2019 European Games
European Games medalists in cycling
European Games bronze medalists for Austria
Cyclists at the 2020 Summer Olympics
Olympic cyclists of Austria
21st-century Austrian people